Fasana may refer to:

 Fasana, a village and a municipality on the western coast of Istria, in Croatia.
 Fasana-class destroyer, group of six destroyers built for the Austro-Hungarian Navy 
 Fasana (surname), an Italian surname
 Fasana Channel, a strait in the northern Adriatic Sea
 Fasana-e-Azad, an Urdu novel by Ratan Nath Dhar Sarshar

See also 

 Fasano